London Metro may refer to:

London Underground - metropolitan train operator in London, England
Metro (British newspaper)  - free newspaper in London, England